Vamberk is a town in Rychnov nad Kněžnou District in the Hradec Králové Region of the Czech Republic. It has about 4,500 inhabitants.

Administrative parts

Villages of Merklovice and Peklo are administrative parts of Vamberk.

Geography
The Zdobnice River flows through the town.

History
The first written mention of Vamberk is from 1341. It was called Waldemberg, and then shortened to Walmberg, and later to Wamberg, or in Czech Vamberk. In 1616, Vamberk gained town privileges. The town lived for centuries from lacemaking, weaving and the timber trade. In the late 19th and early 20th centuries, the textile, stove and meat industries developed, and Vamberk became the industrial centre of the region.

Demographics

Economy

Vamberk is known for the lace production. The first mention of the production in Vamberk is from 1642, but the tradition is probably older. In the mid-17th century, Magdalena of Gramb, a Belgian owner of the Vamberk estate, introduced Belgian lace patterns and a new technique of bobbin lace making using a lace cushion or pillow. Vamberk became a European centre of lace-making. The tradition continues to this day.

The largest employer based in the town is ESAB CZ, the world's leading manufacturer of welding and cutting equipment and welding consumables.

Sights
The Church of Saint Procopius is the main landmark. It was built in Baroque style in 1712–1713.

The tradition of lace making is documented in the Lace Museum Vamberk.

Notable people
Jan Václav Voříšek (1791–1825), composer
Josef Richard Vilímek (1835–1911), publisher
Josef Kalousek (1838–1915), historian

References

External links

Vamberk lace

Cities and towns in the Czech Republic
Populated places in Rychnov nad Kněžnou District